This is a family tree of Chinese monarchs from the Yuan dynasty to the end of the Qing dynasty.



Yuan dynasty and Northern Yuan

The following is the Yuan dynasty family tree. Genghis Khan founded the Mongol Empire in 1206. The empire became split beginning with the succession war of his grandsons Kublai Khan and Ariq Boke. Kublai Khan, after defeating his younger brother Ariq Boke, founded the Yuan dynasty of China in 1271. The dynasty was overthrown by the Ming dynasty during the reign of Toghun Temür in 1368, but it survived in the Mongolian Plateau, known as the Northern Yuan; years of reign over the Northern Yuan (up to 1388) are given in brackets.

Long before Kublai Khan announced the dynastic name "Great Yuan" in 1271, Khagans (Great Khans) of the Mongol State (Yeke Mongγol Ulus) already started to use the Chinese title of Emperor practically in the Chinese language since Spring 1206 in the First Year of the reign of Genghis Khan (as  However, The Mongol Khagans-Emperors and regents before Kublai Khan were only declared Yuan emperors after the creation of Yuan dynasty in 1271.

{{chart|Una=uncertain lineage/ancestrybut Ariq Böke'sdescendants|boxstyle_Una=border-width:0px|Ysd=YesüderJorightu Khan1358–1392r.1388–1392|Elb=ElbegNigülesügchiKhan1361–1399r.1393–1399|Oru=Örüg TemürKhanr.1402–1408|Oyi=Oyiradai?–1425r.1415–1425|Enk=(?)Engke Khan?–1392r.1392|Gun=Gün Temür1377–1402r.1400–1402|Na1=Kharghochok 哈尔古楚克都古楞特穆尔鴻台吉1363–1399|Ole=Öljei TemürBunyashir Khan1379–1412r.1408–1412|Ada=Adai Khan1390–1438r.1425–1438|Aja=Ajai阿齋1399–1438|Del=Delbeg Khan1395–1415r.1412–1415|Tai=Toghtoa BukhaTaisun Khan1413–1453r.1433–1453|Man=Obogh ManduulunManduul Khan1438–1478r.1475–1478|Agb=Agbarjinr.1454|Mor=Markörgis Khan1448–1465r.1455–1465|Mol=Molon Khan?–1466r.1465–1466|Kha=Kharghochok?–1453|Bay=Bayan Mongke1453–1479|Day=BatumöngkeDayan Khan1464–1517/1543r.1479–1517/1543|Tar=Turbolad1482－before1517|Bar=Bars Bolud JinongBarsbolad Khan1490–1519r.1516–1519|Ala=Bodi Alagh1504–1547r.1519–1547|Alt=AndaAltan Khan1507–1582|Gud=Daraisung Guden1520–1557r.1547–1557|Sen=Sengge Düüreng?–1586r.1582–1586|Zas=Tümen Zasagt1539–1592r.1558–1592|Nam=Namudai Sechenr.1586–1607|Sec=Buyan Sechen1554–1604r.1556–1604|Bot=Boshugtur.1613–1627|Mar=Mangghus|Emu=Emùbùr.1627–1634|Lig=Ligdan Khutugtu1588–1634r.1603–1634|Eje=Ejei Khongghor?–1661r.1634–1635|Unk=???|Hoe=Ho'elun|BOR=Börte Ujin|Sor=Sorghaghtani Beki ~1198–1252}}

Ming dynasty and Southern Ming

The following is a simplified family tree for the Ming dynasty, which ruled China between 1368 and 1644.

Those who became emperor are listed in bold, with their years of reign. In China, Ming emperors are best known by their temple names, which are given second below, after the personal name. (The Jianwen Emperor was not awarded a temple name: his posthumous name, Huidi (惠帝), is used instead.) The names given in bold are era names, the form by which Ming emperors are most commonly known in English, but which technically refer to the timespan of an emperor's reign rather than to the emperor himself. (Xingzong and Ruizong are temple names: they never actually ruled, but Xingzong was posthumously granted an emperor's title and Ruizong was raised posthumously to the status of emperor by his son, the Jiajing Emperor, in the Great Rites Controversy.) The imperial family's original family name was Zhu (朱), but the Hongwu Emperor adopted the dynastic name Ming (明) (as were all but one imperial Chinese dynasties), meaning "brilliant". The numbers here indicate the seniority in birth of an emperor's sons as the Ming Dynasty was the only Chinese dynasty to have the eldest surviving son succeed the throne in continuous fashion (though not for the Yongle, from whom all subsequent Ming emperors descend and Jingtai Emperors – both of whom usurped the throne; while the Jiajing – see above, and Chongzhen Emperors succeeded sonless brother), not unlike the Salic Law practised in some contemporary European monarchies (except that the eldest son by a non-principal consort was duly considered). After the fall of the dynasty in 1644 and the Chongzhen Emperor's suicide, a series of Ming princes based in the south of China claimed the imperial title, their court being known as the Southern Ming. These claimants are given with their era names, and the timespans of their purported reigns in brackets. Their purported periods of rule are given in brackets. In 1662, Koxinga regained control of Taiwan from the Dutch colonial regime, and established a state for those who wished restore the Ming dynasty to power. This state lasted until 1683, when it submitted to the Qing dynasty.

Legend:
 - Ming dynasty emperors
 - Southern Ming emperors

 Later Jin and Qing dynasty 
The following is a simplified family tree for the Qing dynasty''',  which was established in 1636, ruled China proper from 1644 to 1912.

Those who became emperor of China are listed in bold, with their years of reign. Nurhaci was Khan of Later Jin from 1616 to 1626. Hong Taiji was Khan of Later Jin from 1626 to 1636, and Emperor of the Qing dynasty from 1636 to 1643. During these periods, the two monarchs only dominated Manchuria, but were not emperors of China as a whole; their years of reign over the dynasty are therefore given in brackets. The names given for emperors are era names, the form by which Qing emperors were most commonly known (with the exception of Puyi, who ruled as the Xuantong Emperor, but was generally known by his given name after his deposition). Puyi abdicated as head of state on February 12, 1912, but was permitted to retain his imperial titles until 1924. The imperial family's original Manchu clan name was Aisin Gioro (lit. "golden clan"). The dynasty was originally titled the Later Jin, in reference to its origins in the Jurchen-led Jin dynasty (1115–1234), by Nurhaci in 1616, but in 1636 Hong Taiji opted to replace this title with the Chinese dynastic title Qing (清), meaning "clear" or "pure".

Family Tree 
 - Qing dynasty emperors
 - 1st generation of Iron Cap Princes
 – – – - The dashed lines denotes the adoptions

References 

Chinese monarchs
Dynasty genealogy
Family trees